John O'Brien Inman (1828–1896) was an American portrait, genre, and landscape painter.  He was the son of Henry Inman and Jane Riker O'Brien. One of Inman's most recognizable works was Moonlight Skating, Central Park.

References

1828 births
1896 deaths
19th-century American painters